Hormak may refer to:
 Hormak, Kerman
 Hormak, Sistan and Baluchestan
 Hormak Rural District, in Sistan and Baluchestan Province